Riviera Ridge is a ridge of Antarctica. The name alludes to the warm sunny conditions experienced on the ridge in contrast to the storm conditions previously experienced on nearby "Hurricane Ridge" (an unofficial name also employed at the time by Wright). A map of this area exhibiting the two names appears in a paper by Kyle and Wright in the American Geophysical Union Research Series, v. 48, p. 124.
 

Ridges of Victoria Land
Scott Coast